In mathematics, the Köthe conjecture is a problem in ring theory, open . It is formulated in various ways. Suppose that R is a ring. One way to state the conjecture is that if R has no nil ideal, other than {0}, then it has no nil one-sided ideal, other than {0}.

This question was posed in 1930 by Gottfried Köthe (1905–1989). The Köthe conjecture has been shown to be true for various classes of rings, such as polynomial identity rings and right Noetherian rings, but a general solution remains elusive.

Equivalent formulations
The conjecture has several different formulations:
 (Köthe conjecture) In any ring, the sum of two nil left ideals is nil.
 In any ring, the sum of two one-sided nil ideals is nil. 
 In any ring, every nil left or right ideal of the ring is contained in the upper nil radical of the ring.
 For any ring R and for any nil ideal J of R, the matrix ideal Mn(J) is a nil ideal of Mn(R) for every n.
 For any ring R and for any nil ideal J of R, the matrix ideal M2(J) is a nil ideal of M2(R).
 For any ring R, the upper nilradical of Mn(R) is the set of matrices with entries from the upper nilradical of R for every positive integer n.
 For any ring R and for any nil ideal J of R, the polynomials with indeterminate x and coefficients from J lie in the Jacobson radical of the polynomial ring R[x].
 For any ring R, the Jacobson radical of R[x] consists of the polynomials with coefficients from the upper nilradical of R.

Related problems
A conjecture by Amitsur read: "If J is a nil ideal in R, then J[x] is a nil ideal of the polynomial ring R[x]." This conjecture, if true, would have proven the Köthe conjecture through the equivalent statements above, however a counterexample was produced by Agata Smoktunowicz. While not a disproof of the Köthe conjecture, this fueled suspicions that the Köthe conjecture may be false.

In , it was proven that a ring which is the direct sum of two nilpotent subrings is itself nilpotent. The question arose whether or not "nilpotent" could be replaced with "locally nilpotent" or "nil". Partial progress was made when Kelarev produced an example of a ring which isn't nil, but is the direct sum of two locally nilpotent rings. This demonstrates that Kegel's question with "locally nilpotent" replacing "nilpotent" is answered in the negative.

The sum of a nilpotent subring and a nil subring is always nil.

References

External links
 PlanetMath page
 Survey paper (PDF)

Ring theory
Conjectures
Unsolved problems in mathematics